Peter Kent Navarro (born July 15, 1949) is an American political figure who served in the Trump administration as the Assistant to the President, Director of Trade and Manufacturing Policy, and the national Defense Production Act policy coordinator. He previously served as a Deputy Assistant to the President and Director of the White House National Trade Council, a newly created entity in the White House Office, until it was folded into the Office of Trade and Manufacturing Policy, a new role established by executive order in April 2017. He is also a professor emeritus of economics and public policy at the Paul Merage School of Business, University of California, Irvine, and the author of Death by China, among other publications. Navarro ran unsuccessfully for office in San Diego, California, five times.

Navarro's views on trade are significantly outside the mainstream of economic thought, and are widely considered fringe by other economists. A strong proponent of reducing U.S. trade deficits, Navarro is well known as a critic of Germany and China and has accused both nations of currency manipulation. He has called for increasing the size of the American manufacturing sector, setting high tariffs, and "repatriating global supply chains." He is also a vocal opponent of multilateral free trade agreements such as NAFTA and the Trans-Pacific Partnership Agreement.

In the Trump administration, Navarro was a hawkish advisor on trade, as he encouraged Trump to implement trade protectionist policies. In explaining his role in the Trump administration, Navarro said that he is there to "provide the underlying analytics that confirm [Trump's] intuition [on trade]. And his intuition is always right in these matters." In 2018, as the Trump administration was implementing trade restrictionist policies, Navarro argued that no countries would retaliate against U.S. tariffs "for the simple reason that we are the most lucrative and biggest market in the world"; shortly after the implementation of the tariffs, other countries did implement retaliatory tariffs against the United States, leading to trade wars.

During his final year in the Trump administration, Navarro was involved in the administration's COVID-19 response. Early on, he issued private warnings within the administration about the threat posed by the virus, but downplayed the risks in public. He publicly clashed with Anthony Fauci, the director of the National Institute of Allergy and Infectious Diseases, as Navarro touted hydroxychloroquine as a treatment of COVID-19 and condemned various public health measures to stop the spread of the virus. 

After Joe Biden won the 2020 election and Donald Trump refused to concede, Navarro advanced conspiracy theories of election fraud and in February 2022 was subpoenaed to testify before the House Select Committee on the January 6 Attack. Navarro refused to comply, asserting executive privilege, and was referred to the Justice Department; a grand jury indicted him on two counts of contempt of Congress on June 2, 2022; he pleaded not guilty two weeks later.

Early life and education
Navarro was born on July 15, 1949, in Cambridge, Massachusetts. His father, Albert "Al" Navarro, a saxophonist and clarinetist, led a house band, which played summers in New Hampshire and winters in Florida. After his parents divorced when he was 9 or 10, he lived with his mother, Evelyn Littlejohn, a Saks Fifth Avenue secretary, in Palm Beach, Florida. As a teen, he lived in Bethesda, Maryland in a one-bedroom apartment with his mother and brother. Navarro attended Bethesda-Chevy Chase High School.

Navarro attended Tufts University on an academic scholarship, graduating in 1972 with a Bachelor of Arts degree. He then spent three years in the U.S. Peace Corps, serving in Thailand. He earned a Master of Public Administration from Harvard University's John F. Kennedy School of Government in 1979, and a PhD in economics from Harvard under the supervision of Richard E. Caves in 1986.

Career

Academic career
From 1981 through 1985, he was a research associate at Harvard's Energy and Environmental Policy Center. From 1985 through 1988, he taught at the University of California, San Diego and the University of San Diego. In 1989 he moved to the University of California, Irvine as a professor of economics and public policy. He continued on the UC Irvine faculty for more than 20 years and is now a professor emeritus. He has worked on energy issues and the relationship between the United States and Asia. He has received multiple teaching awards for MBA courses he has taught.

As a doctoral student in 1984, Navarro wrote a book entitled The Policy Game: How Special Interests and Ideologues are Stealing America, which claimed that special interest groups had led the United States to "a point in its history where it cannot grow and prosper." In the book, he also called for greater worker's compensation to help those who had lost jobs to trade and foreign competition. His doctoral dissertation on why corporations donate to charity is one of his most cited works. He has also done research in the topic of wind energy with Frank Harris, a former student of his.

Publications
Navarro has written over a dozen books on various topics in economics and specializing in issues of balance of trade. He has published peer-reviewed economics research on energy policy, charity, deregulation and the economics of trash collection. Describing Navarro, the Economist magazine wrote that he "is a prolific writer, but has no publications in top-tier academic journals... [although] his research interests are broader than the average economist's."

The Coming China Wars is a book published by FT Press in (2006). Navarro examines China as an emerging world power confronting challenges at home and abroad as it struggles to exert itself in the global market. He also discusses how China's role in international commerce is creating conflicts with nations around the world over energy, natural resources, the environment, intellectual property, and other issues. A review in Publishers Weekly describes the book as "comprehensive" and "contemporary" and concludes that it "will teach readers to understand the dragon, just not how to vanquish it".

Death by China (2011) is a book by Navarro and Greg Autry. According to The Economist, "the core allegations Mr. Navarro makes against China are not all that controversial. He accuses China of keeping its currency cheap ... He deplores China's practice of forcing American firms to hand over intellectual property as a condition of access to its market. He notes, correctly, that Chinese firms pollute the environment more freely and employ workers in far worse conditions than American rules allow." Navarro argues that China violates fair trade by "illegal export subsidies and currency manipulation, effectively flooding the U.S. markets" and unfairly making it "virtually impossible" for American companies to compete. It is a critique of "global capitalism", including foreign labor practices and environmental protection. Currency manipulation and subsidies are stated as reasons that "American companies cannot compete because they're not competing with Chinese companies, they're competing with the Chinese government."

In 2012, Navarro directed and produced a documentary film based on his book, Death by China. The film, described as "fervently anti-China", was released under the same title and narrated by Martin Sheen. From 2011 until 2016, Navarro was a frequent guest on the radio program The John Batchelor Show.

Early political career

Campaigns for public office
While teaching at UC Irvine, Navarro ran unsuccessfully for office in San Diego, California, five times. In 1992, he ran for mayor, finishing first (38.2%) in the primary, but lost with 48% to Susan Golding in the runoff. During his mayoral campaign, Navarro ran on a no-growth platform.  He paid $4,000 in fines and court costs for violating city and state election laws.

In 1993, he ran for San Diego city council, and in 1994 for San Diego County board of supervisors, losing each time. In 1996, he ran for the 49th Congressional District as the Democratic Party nominee, touting himself as an environmental activist, but lost to Republican Brian Bilbray, 52.7% to 41.9%. In 2001, Navarro ran in a special election to fill the District 6 San Diego city council seat, but lost in a special election with 7.85% of the vote.

Political positions
Navarro's political affiliations and policy positions have been described as "hotly disputed and across the spectrum." While he lived in Massachusetts studying for his PhD at Harvard, he was a registered Democrat. When he moved to California in 1986, he was initially registered as nonpartisan, and became a registered Republican in 1989. By 1991, he had again re-registered as an Independent, and carried that affiliation during the 1992 San Diego mayoral election. Around this time, he still considered himself a conservative Republican.

Navarro rejoined the Democratic Party in 1994 and remained a Democrat during each of his subsequent political campaigns. In 1996, while he was running for Congress, Navarro was endorsed by then-First Lady Hillary Clinton and spoke at the 1996 Democratic Convention, saying, "I'm proud to be carrying the Clinton-Gore banner." He positioned himself as a "strong environmentalist and a progressive on social issues such as choice, gay rights, and religious freedom."

Navarro supported Hillary Clinton's presidential campaign in 2008. Navarro supported President Barack Obama's phase-out of incandescent light bulbs, the adoption of wind energy, and carbon taxes in order to stop global warming.

During the 2016 Presidential election, Navarro described himself as "a Reagan Democrat and a Trump Democrat abandoned by my party." Despite this, Navarro was critical of Ronald Reagan's defense spending, called GDP growth during the administration a "Failure of Reaganomics" and described the "10-5-3" tax proposal as "a very large corporate subsidy."

During the early stage of the Trump administration, Navarro was still known to be a Democrat, but by February 2018 he had again re-registered as a Republican.

Trump campaign advisor 
In 2016, Navarro served as an economic policy adviser to Donald Trump's 2016 presidential campaign. He advocated for an isolationist and protectionist American foreign policy. Navarro and the international private equity investor Wilbur Ross authored an economic plan for the Trump campaign in September 2016. Navarro was invited to be an adviser after Trump's advisor and son-in-law Jared Kushner saw on Amazon that he co-wrote Death by China. When told that the Tax Policy Center assessment of Trump's economic plan said it would reduce federal revenues by $6 trillion and reduce economic growth in the long term, Navarro said that the analysis demonstrated "a high degree of analytical and political malfeasance". When the Peterson Institute for International Affairs estimated that Trump's economic plan would cost millions of Americans their jobs, Navarro said that writers at the Peterson Institute "weave a false narrative and they come up with some phony numbers." According to MIT economist Simon Johnson, the economic plan essay authored by Navarro and Ross for Trump during the campaign had projections "based on assumptions so unrealistic that they seem to have come from a different planet. If the United States really did adopt Trump's plan, the result would be an immediate and unmitigated disaster." When 370 economists, including 19 Nobel laureates, signed a letter warning against Trump's stated economic policies in November 2016, Navarro said that the letter was "an embarrassment to the corporate offshoring wing of the economist profession who continues to insist bad trade deals are good for America."

In October 2016, along with Wilbur Ross and Andy Puzder, Navarro co-authored an essay titled "Economic Analysis of Donald Trump's Contract with the American Voter".

Trump administration

White House trade advisor

On December 21, 2016, Navarro was selected by President-elect Trump to head a newly created position, as director of the White House National Trade Council. In the administration, Navarro was a hawkish advisor on trade, as he encouraged Trump to implement trade protectionist policies. The New York Times wrote of Navarro in 2019 that he "has managed to exert enormous influence over United States trade policy" in the Trump administration. In explaining his role in the Trump administration, Navarro said that he is there to "provide the underlying analytics that confirm [Trump's] intuition [on trade]. And his intuition is always right in these matters." In 2018, as the Trump administration was initiating the China–United States trade war, Navarro argued that no countries would retaliate against U.S. tariffs "for the simple reason that we are the most lucrative and biggest market in the world"; shortly after the implementation of the tariffs, other countries did implement retaliatory tariffs against the United States, and the World Trade Organization rejected the U.S. tariffs.

The United States Office of Special Counsel ruled in December 2020 that Navarro repeatedly violated the Hatch Act by using his official capacity to influence elections in speaking against Trump's opponent Joe Biden during the presidential campaign.

Director of Office of Trade and Manufacturing Policy
In April 2017, the National Trade Council became part of the Office of Trade and Manufacturing Policy, of which Navarro was appointed Director. By September 2017, the Office of Trade and Manufacturing Policy had been folded into the National Economic Council, which meant that Navarro would report to NEC Director Gary Cohn.

In February 2018, several media outlets reported that Navarro's influence in the administration was rising again and that he would likely be promoted from the secondary billet of Deputy Assistant to the President to Assistant to the President, giving Navarro parity with the NEC Director. Josh Rogin, writing for The Washington Post, reported that Navarro had used his prior time of lower influence to lead several low-profile policy items, such as working to increase military funding, drafting Executive Order 13806, and leading the effort to solve a dispute between the United States and Qatar over the Open Skies Agreement between the two countries.

In June 2018, Navarro said that there was "a special place in hell" for Canadian Prime Minister Justin Trudeau, after Trudeau said that Canada would respond to U.S. tariffs against Canada with  retaliatory tariffs. Trudeau's remarks and Canada's response to these tariffs were already public and well known when Navarro made this comment. Navarro later apologized.

In May 2019, Navarro said that Trump's decision to place tariffs on Mexico unless Mexico stopped illegal immigration to the United States as "a brilliant move".

In September 2019, after Trump tasked him with combatting China's usage of international mail rates to more cheaply ship products into the US, Navarro successfully led a diplomatic effort to the third Extraordinary Congress of the Universal Postal Union, where it agreed member countries could opt-in to self-declare their rates starting in July 2020. This agreement arose following repeated threats from the Trump administration to leave the UPU unless global postage rates were changed; at the summit, Navarro claimed that countries like China were unfairly benefitting from international delivery prices, particularly when it came to e-commerce deliveries.

Navarro continued to advocate for trade restrictionist policies even while the administration was trying to reach a compromise in trade negotiations between the two countries.

Navarro worked with the DHS to initiate a crackdown on counterfeited and pirated e-commerce goods from overseas, and he promoted the administration's actions on the matter. Trump signed an executive order on the matter on January 31, 2020.

In February 2020, it was reported that Navarro was conducting his own investigation into the identity of the author of an anonymous op-ed in The New York Times criticizing the Trump Administration.

Infrastructure plan
During the campaign Navarro, together with Wilbur Ross, who became Trump's Commerce Secretary, designed a $1 trillion infrastructure development plan for Trump's presidential campaign. The plan called for $137 billion in tax credits to private business to induce them to finance the bulk of infrastructure spending. Economists across the political spectrum derided the proposal. Trump released a $1.5 trillion version of this plan in February 2018 but the Republican-controlled Congress showed little enthusiasm for the proposal, with The Hill reporting, "President Trump's infrastructure plan appears to have crashed and burned in Congress".

Coronavirus pandemic
On January 29, 2020, Navarro issued a memo warning that novel coronavirus could "evolv[e] into a full-blown pandemic, imperiling the lives of millions of Americans" and that the "risk of a worst-case pandemic scenario should not be overlooked". He argued for restrictions on travel from China. Navarro wrote another memo on February 23, 2020, arguing that the disease "could infect as many as 100 million Americans, with a loss of life of as many as 1-2 million souls" and calling for an "immediate supplemental appropriation of at least $3 billion." At the same time that Navarro issued these private warnings, he publicly stated that the American people had "nothing to worry about" regarding the coronavirus.

On March 27, 2020, Trump appointed Navarro to coordinate the federal government's Defense Production Act policy response during the coronavirus pandemic. In this position, Navarro promoted domestic production of coronavirus-related supplies in addition to a general nationalist agenda. He advocated for reducing U.S. reliance on foreign supply chains, stating that "never again should we rely on the rest of the world for our essential medicines and countermeasures." Among other statements, he accused China of "profiteering" from the coronavirus and warned of economic disruptions resulting from the virus.

In February 2020 virologist Steven Hatfill became Navarro's advisor with regard to the coronavirus pandemic. Hatfill was a strong promoter of the malaria drug hydroxychloroquine as a treatment for covid, even though the drug's effectiveness was unproven. By April Navarro, and the president himself, were touting the drug as a lifesaver. Navarro clashed with Anthony Fauci, the director of the National Institute of Allergy and Infectious Diseases, over whether the administration should promote the use of hydroxychloroquine to treat the virus. In July 2020, Navarro touted a widely criticized study as showing that hydroxychloroquine was an effective coronavirus treatment; public health experts pointed to limitations with the study and to the fact that multiple randomized controlled trials failed to conclude that hydroxychloroquine was an effective treatment.

In May 2020, Navarro criticized stay-at-home orders, arguing that the COVID-19 lockdowns will kill "many more" people than the coronavirus.

In July 2020, USA Today published an editorial by Navarro under the headline "Anthony Fauci has been wrong about everything I have interacted with him on," after which White House officials disavowed Navarro's attacks. The newspaper, under criticism for the editorial, later published an apologetic statement that read, in part, "several of Navarro’s criticisms of Fauci — on the China travel restrictions, the risk from the coronavirus and falling mortality rates — were misleading or lacked context. As such, Navarro’s op-ed did not meet USA TODAY’s fact-checking standards." During a Fox News appearance in March 2021, Navarro echoed a baseless conspiracy theory that Fauci was the “father” of the virus and had used taxpayer money to finance  a Chinese laboratory where it was supposedly developed.

In August 2020, administration officials terminated a contract that Navarro had directly negotiated for the purchase of 42,900 ventilators for use in the pandemic. A US Department of Health and Human Services (HHS) spokesperson said the cancellation was "subject to internal HHS investigation and legal review", as an oversight subcommittee of the US House of Representatives concluded that the government had overpaid for the ventilators by US$500 million.

The Washington Post reported in March 2021 that congressional investigators were examining whether Navarro had directed over $1 billion in federal funds for medical supplies to companies of his selection, after his recommendations had been rejected by President Trump.

Attempts to overturn the 2020 election 

After Joe Biden won the 2020 election, President Donald Trump refused to concede, and Navarro worked actively on plans to overturn the legal results of the 2020 election. Navarro and Steve Bannon coordinated this effort, called "The Green Bay Sweep", with more than 100 Republican state legislators. In December 2020, Navarro published a report alleging widespread election fraud. (In March 2022, The Guardian reported the original version of the allegations in Navarro's report had in fact been prepared by individuals in Navarro's own White House office beginning two weeks before the 2020 Presidential elections.) The report repeated widely discredited conspiracy theories regarding claims of election fraud and listed various allegations that had been dismissed by the courts. Alleged election fraud in the 2020 Presidential had been widely debunked by Trump's election security task force. In the report, Navarro wrote that large initial leads by Trump in battleground states, which turned to leads for Biden as vote counting progressed, suggested impropriety. Navarro was actually describing the well-known phenomenon of the "blue shift", caused by the fact that mail-in votes in many states cannot be counted on Election Day itself; those votes tend to lean Democratic, so that an Election Night lead by a Republican candidate can turn into a Democratic lead as the later counts come in. In the report, Navarro cited many biased and unreliable sources of information, such as One America News Network, Newsmax, Steve Bannon's podcast "War Room: Pandemic", Just the News, and the National Pulse, because they provided what he termed "alternative coverage". In 2021 Navarro published a book, In Trump Time, in which he describes how he worked with Bannon and others on plans to delay or overturn Congress's formal count of the election results, in part by having Pence reject some Biden elector slates.

On January 2, 2021, Navarro, along with Rudy Giuliani and Mark Meadows, participated in a call with Georgia election officials in which Trump urged them to overturn the results of the election.

During a January 2, 2021 appearance on Jeanine Pirro's Fox News program, Navarro asserted "[t]hey stole this and we can prove it", and falsely asserted Joe Biden's inauguration could be postponed to allow for an investigation. Navarro stated, “We spent a lot of time lining up over 100 congressmen, including some senators. It started out perfectly. At 1 p.m., Gosar and Cruz did exactly what was expected of them ... My role was to provide the receipts for the 100 congressmen or so who would make their cases… who could rely in part on the body of evidence I'd collected".  ”In the wake of the storming of the Capitol on January6, 2021, Navarro appeared on Fox Business Network's Making Money on January8, telling host Charles Payne that Trump was not to blame and specifically saying that Lindsey Graham, Nikki Haley, and Mitt Romney "need to shut up". Days later, Navarro reiterated false claims that Trump had won the election. By December 2021, he was still claiming his falsehoods were meant “to lay the legal predicate for the actions to be taken" despite no evidence of voting fraud being found. 

In February 2022, the House Select Committee on the January 6 Attack subpoenaed Navarro to provide testimony. Navarro said he would not comply, citing a claim of executive privilege made by the former president. On April 6, 2022, the House of Representative voted to hold Navarro and Dan Scavino in contempt for their refusals to testify before the House Select Committee on the basis of Executive Privilege claims. On May 30, 2022, it was revealed that plans were made for a federal lawsuit over Navarro's refusal to testify had begun, with Navarro saying he was subpoenaed by a grand jury and ordered to surrender any documents he had related to the January 6, 2021 attack on the U.S. Capitol. Despite the grand jury subpoena, the planned lawsuit has yet to be filed in court.

Indictment 
On  June 2, 2022 a grand jury impaneled in the United States District Court for the District of Columbia indicted Navarro on two counts of contempt of Congress. Count 1 of the indictment alleged Navarro refused to comply with a subpoena to produce documents on February 23, 2022; Count 2 alleged refusal to comply with a subpoena for testimony on March 2, 2022. Under the applicable law each count is a misdemeanor punishable by up to one year imprisonment. Navarro was arrested at National Airport as he was about to board a plane to Nashville and taken into custody by agents from the U.S. Marshals service.  In documents released days after the arrest, the FBI denied claims Navarro and his allies had made in the media, including that he was denied the right to call an attorney, deprived of food and water and that he had been pulled off a plane. Navarro said he had been shackled, but the FBI mentioned only he had been handcuffed, and that he had called agents "kind Nazis." U.S. District Court Judge Amit Mehta on July 15, 2022, signaled that he agrees that the treatment of Navarro at the outset of the criminal case was "unreasonably harsh". Mehta later set the trial date for January 11, 2023.

Justice Department lawsuit
On August 3, 2022, the Department of Justice filed a lawsuit demanding that Navarro turn over emails from a private phone account that he used to conduct White House business. The suit alleges that he has not responded to requests from the National Archives for those records and that he has demanded a grant of immunity before he will release them. On March 9, 2023, Navarro was ordered to turn over the emails from his private account under the Presidential Records Act.

Views on trade 

Navarro has been a staunch critic of trade with China and strong proponent of reducing U.S. trade deficits. He has attacked Germany, Japan and China for their currency manipulation. He has called for increasing the size of the American manufacturing sector, setting high tariffs, and repatriating global supply chains. He was a fierce opponent of the Trans-Pacific Partnership.

According to Bloomberg News, Navarro had "roots as a mainstream economist" as he voiced support for free trade in his 1984 book The Policy Game. He changed his positions as he saw "the globalist erosion of the American economy" develop. He would later become a critic of the North American Free Trade Agreement (NAFTA).

According to Politico, Navarro's economic theories are "considered fringe" by his fellow economists. A New Yorker reporter described Navarro's views on trade and China as so radical "that, even with his assistance, I was unable to find another economist who fully agrees with them." 
The Economist described Navarro as having "oddball views". The George Mason University economist Tyler Cowen has described Navarro as "one of the most versatile and productive American economists of the last few decades", but Cowen noted that he disagreed with his views on trade, which he claimed go "against a strong professional consensus." University of Michigan economist Justin Wolfers described Navarro's views as "far outside the mainstream," noting that "he endorses few of the key tenets of" the economics profession. According to Lee Branstetter, economics professor at Carnegie Mellon University and trade expert with the Peterson Institute for International Economics, Navarro "was never a part of the group of economists who ever studied the global free-trade system ... He doesn't publish in journals. What he's writing and saying right now has nothing to do with what he got his Harvard Ph.D. in ... he doesn't do research that would meet the scientific standards of that community." Marcus Noland, an economist at the Peterson Institute for International Economics, described a tax and trade paper written by Navarro and Wilbur Ross for Trump as "a complete misunderstanding of international trade, on their part."

In August 2019, Navarro asserted the tariffs of the ongoing China–United States trade war were not hurting Americans. Citing extensive evidence to the contrary, Politifact rated Navarro's assertion "Pants on Fire."

Border adjustment tax 
Navarro supports a tax policy called "border adjustment", which, as commonly used in the VATs of most countries, taxes all imports at the domestic rate while rebating tax on exports, essentially transforming taxes from taxes on production to taxes on consumption. In response to criticism that the border adjustment tax could hurt U.S. companies and put jobs at risk, Navarro called it "fake news".

Criticism of China 
According to Politico, "Navarro is perhaps the most extreme advocate in Washington, and maybe in all of economics, for an aggressive stance toward China." Navarro put his attention to China in the mid-2000s. His first publication on the subject is the 2006 book The Coming China Wars: Where They Will Be Fought, How They Can Be Won. Navarro has said that he started to examine China when he noticed that his former students were losing jobs, concluding that China was at fault.

In Politicos description of the book, "Navarro uses military language to refer to China's trade policies, referring to its 'conquest' of the world's export markets, which has 'vaporized literally millions of manufacturing jobs and driven down wages.' ... China's aspirations are so insatiable, he claims, that eventually there will be a clash over "our most basic of all needs—bread, water, and air.'" Navarro has described the entry of China to the World Trade Organization as one of the United States' biggest mistakes. To respond to the threat posed to the United States, Navarro has advocated for 43% tariffs, the repudiation of trade pacts, major increases in military expenditures and strengthened military ties with Taiwan. The New York Times notes that "a wide range of economists have warned that curtailing trade with China would damage the American economy, forcing consumers to pay higher prices for goods and services." Navarro has reportedly also encouraged Trump to enact a 25% tariff on Chinese steel imports, something that "trade experts worry... would upend global trade practices and cause countries to retaliate, potentially leading to a trade war".

Navarro has said that a large part of China's competitive advantage over the United States stems from unfair trade practices. Navarro has criticized China for pollution, poor labor standards, government subsidies, producing "contaminated, defective and cancerous" exports, currency manipulation, and theft of US intellectual property. In his 2012 documentary, Navarro said that China caused the loss of 57,000 US factories and 25 million jobs. Navarro has maintained that China manipulates its currency and, on August 5, 2019, the U.S. Treasury Department officially designated China as a "currency manipulator."

Of the more than dozen China specialists contacted by Foreign Policy, most either did not know of Navarro or had only interacted with him briefly. Kenneth Pomeranz, University of Chicago professor of Chinese History, said that his "recollection is that [Navarro] generally avoided people who actually knew something about the country." Columnist Gordon G. Chang was the only China watcher contacted by Foreign Policy who defended Navarro, but even he noted that he disagreed with Navarro's claims of currency manipulation, opposition to the TPP, and calls for high tariffs. James McGregor, a former chairman of the American Chamber of Commerce in China, said that Navarro's books and documentary on China "have close to zero credibility with people who know the country," and are filled with "hyperbole, inaccuracies" and a "cartoonish caricature of China that he puts out."

Some of Navarro's views on China fit within the mainstream, such as criticism of Chinese currency manipulation (pre-2015), concern that China's rapid ascension to the World Trade Organization harmed the Rust Belt, and criticism of China's weak environmental regulations and poor labor standards.

Ron Vara 
In six of his books about China, Navarro quotes a "Ron Vara", whom he describes as a China hawk and former Harvard PhD doctoral student in economics, and who says Sinophobic things about China and the Chinese. An investigation by the Chronicle of Higher Education found that no such person existed, and that Ron Vara (an anagram of Navarro) appeared to represent views that Navarro himself held. Navarro has admitted to making up the character, an author surrogate, and quoting him in his books. Economist Glenn Hubbard, who co-authored Seeds of Destruction with Navarro, has said he was not aware that Vara was fictional, and that he did not approve of Navarro attributing information to a fictional source. In December 2019, a memo apparently authored by Ron Vara began circulating in Washington DC. The memo highlighted the "Keep Tariff Argument" and the use of tariffs against China a few days before an additional 15% tariff on $160 billion of Chinese made goods was set to be implemented. Navarro later confirmed that he had written the memo.

In response to the "Ron Vara" character, Ministry of Foreign Affairs of the People's Republic of China spokesperson Hua Chunying accused Navarro of "smearing China with lies".。

Germany 
Navarro drew controversy when he accused Germany of using a "grossly undervalued" euro to "exploit" the US and the rest of the European Union. Politico noted that the German government does not set the value of the euro. Economists and commentators are divided on the accuracy of Navarro's remarks. Economist Paul Krugman said that Navarro was right and wrong at the same time: "Yes, Germany in effect has an undervalued currency relative to what it would have without the euro... But does this mean that the euro as a whole is undervalued against the dollar? Probably not." Boston University economist Laurence Kotlikoff described Navarro's accusation of Germany as a currency manipulator as "#stupideconomics".

Manufacturing 
Navarro argues that the decline in US manufacturing jobs is chiefly due to "unfair trade practices and bad trade deals. And if you don't believe that, just go to the booming factories in Germany, in Japan, in Korea, in China, in Malaysia, in Vietnam, in Indonesia, in Italy—every place that we're running deficits with." However, many economists attribute the decline in manufacturing jobs chiefly to automation and other innovations that allow manufacturing firms to produce more goods with fewer workers, rather than trade.

Navarro has been a proponent of strengthening the manufacturing sector's role in the national economy: "We envision a more Germany-style economy, where 20 percent of our workforce is in manufacturing. ... And we're not talking about banging tin in the back room." The New York Times notes that "experts on manufacturing ... doubt that the government can significantly increase factory employment, noting that mechanization is the major reason fewer people are working in factories."

Opposition to NAFTA 
Navarro has called for the United States to leave the North American Free Trade Agreement, and has tried to convince Trump to initiate a withdrawal.

Repatriation of global supply chains 
Navarro has called for repatriating global supply chains. According to Politico'''s Jacob Heilbrunn, such a move "would be enormously costly and take years to execute".

 Trade as a national security risk 
Navarro has framed trade as a national security risk.
Navarro has characterized foreign purchases of U.S. companies as a threat to national security, but according to NPR, this is "a fringe view that puts him at odds with the vast majority of economists." Dartmouth economist Douglas Irwin noted that the US government already reviews foreign purchases of companies with military or strategic value, and has on occasion rejected such deals. Irwin said that Navarro had not substantiated his claim with any evidence.

Navarro has also said that the United States has "already begun to lose control of [its] food supply chain", which according to NPR, "sounded pretty off-the-wall to a number of economists" who noted that the US is a massive exporter of food. Dermot Hayes, an agribusiness economist at Iowa State University, described Navarro's statement as "uninformed".

Navarro criticized the outsourcing of critical materials — like the production of essential medical supplies — to China.

 Trade deficits 

Navarro is a proponent of the notion that trade deficits are bad in and of themselves, a view which is widely rejected by trade experts and economists. In a white paper co-authored with Wilbur Ross, Navarro stated, "when a country runs a trade deficit by importing more than it exports, this subtracts from growth." In a Wall Street Journal op-ed defending his views, Navarro stated, "If we are able to reduce our trade deficits through tough, smart negotiations, we should be able to increase our growth." Harvard University economics professor Gregory Mankiw has said that Navarro's views on the trade deficit are based on the kind of mistakes that "even a freshman at the end of ec 10 knows." Tufts University professor Daniel W. Drezner said about Navarro's op-ed, "as someone who's written on this topic I could not for the life of me understand his reasoning". According to Tyler Cowen, "close to no one" in the economics profession agrees with Navarro's idea that a trade deficit is bad in and of itself. Nobel laureate Angus Deaton described Navarro's attitude on trade deficits as "an old-fashioned mercantilist position."The Economist has described Navarro's views on the trade deficit as "dodgy economics", while the Financial Times has described them as "poor economics". Economists Noah Smith, Scott Sumner, Olivier Blanchard, and Phil Levy have also criticized Navarro's views on the trade deficit. Dan Ikenson, director of the Cato Institute's Herbert A. Stiefel Center for Trade Policy Studies, goes so far as to call Navarro a "charlatan" and says that "99.9 per cent of respectable economists would eschew" what he says: "He says imports deduct from output, and he calls that accounting identity the 'economic growth formula'. He thinks that for every dollar we import, our GDP is reduced by a dollar. I don't know how he got his PhD at Harvard."

 Opposition to Trans-Pacific Partnership 
Navarro opposes the Trans-Pacific Partnership. In an April 2015 op-ed, Navarro said, "To woo us, their spinmeisters boast the TPP will spur American exports to stimulate sorely needed economic growth. In truth, the American economy will suffer severely. This is because the TPP will hammer two main drivers of economic growth—domestic investment and 'net exports.'" Navarro said in March 2017 that TPP "would have been a "death knell" to America's auto and vehicle parts industry that we "urgently need to bring back to full life." Politico's Jacob Heilbrunn and the Economist argue that there may be a disconnect between Navarro's policy on China and his opposition to the TPP, as scuttling the TPP will strengthen China's hand.

 Personal life 
In 2001 Navarro married Leslie Lebon, a California architect. The couple lived in Laguna Beach with Lebon's son from a previous marriage while Navarro was a professor at UC Irvine. In late 2018, Lebon filed for divorce in Orange County. Their divorce became final in December 2020.

 Bibliography 

 In Trump Time: My Journal of America’s Plague Year (2021)
 Crouching Tiger: What China's Militarism Means for the World (2015)
 Death by China: Confronting the Dragon– A Global Call to Action (2011)
 Seeds of Destruction (with Glenn Hubbard) (2010)
 Always a Winner: Finding Your Competitive Advantage in an Up and Down Economy (2009)
 The Well-Timed Strategy: Managing the Business Cycle for Competitive Advantage (2006)
 The Coming China Wars (2006)
 What the Best MBAs Know (2005)
 Principles of Economics: Business, Banking, Finance, and Your Everyday Life (2005)
 When the Market Moves, Will You Be Ready? (2003)
 If It's Raining in Brazil, Buy Starbucks (2001)
 Bill Clinton's Agenda for America (1993)
 Job Opportunities Under Clinton/Gore (with Craig Adams) (1993)
 The Policy Game (1984)
 The Dimming of America: The Real Costs of Electric Utility Regulation'' (1984)

References

External links

 
 
 University of California, Irvine faculty profile

1949 births
Living people
21st-century American economists
American conspiracy theorists
American economics writers
Bethesda-Chevy Chase High School alumni
California Democrats
California Republicans
COVID-19 conspiracy theorists
Economists from California
Economists from Florida
Economists from Maryland
Harvard Kennedy School alumni
Peace Corps volunteers
People from Bethesda, Maryland
People from Cambridge, Massachusetts
People from Palm Beach, Florida
Trump administration personnel
Tufts University alumni
University of California, Irvine faculty
Harvard Graduate School of Arts and Sciences alumni